Riverside is a neighborhood/section in the town of Greenwich in Fairfield County, Connecticut,  United States. As of the 2020 census, it had a population of 8,843.

The town of Greenwich is one political and taxing body, but consists of several distinct sections or neighborhoods, such as Banksville, Byram, Cos Cob, Glenville, Mianus,  Old Greenwich, Riverside, and Greenwich (sometimes referred to as central, or downtown, Greenwich). Of these neighborhoods, three (Cos Cob, Old Greenwich, and Riverside) have separate postal names and ZIP codes.

History
St. Catherine of Sienna Church hosts a week long carnival in June or July that has happened for over 40 years.
St. Paul's Episcopal Church, at 200 Riverside Avenue in Riverside, has held its "Fair for All" since 1942. Money raised goes directly to local charities.

Riverside has two sites listed on the National Register of Historic Places:
 Riverside Avenue Bridge, Riverside Avenue over railroad tracks; built in 1894; listed in 1977
 Samuel Ferris House, Cary Road; built in about 1760; listed in 1989

Geography
According to the U.S. Census Bureau, Riverside has a total area of 3.23 mi2 (8.36 km2), of which 2.42 mi2 (6.27 km2) is land and 0.81 mi2 (2.09 km2), or 24.98%, is water.

Riverside is bounded to the west by Greenwich and Cos Cob, both across the Mianus River. The town's eastern border is with Old Greenwich.

Demographics
Riverside is majority white town, with 75% of its inhabitants being white, 10% being asian, 1% being black, and the rest others or a combination. Riverside also has a high concentration of young people, with one-third of its residents being under 18.

Transportation
The neighborhood is served by the Riverside Railroad Station on the Metro-North line, although some residents are closer to the Old Greenwich Train Station.

Interstate 95 cuts through the neighborhood.

Notable people
Well-known residents of Riverside include Lara Spencer, television journalist, and Lois Darling, an author, illustrator and researcher.  Gold Medal ice skater Dorothy Hamill and Philadelphia Flyers forward Cam Atkinson also grew up in Riverside. Riverside is also home to Kathie Lee Gifford. Detroit Red Wings defenseman Marc Staal  also lives in Riverside with his family. Former NFL player Tiki Barber also lives in Riverside along with his two daughters and two sons.

References

Neighborhoods in Connecticut
Greenwich, Connecticut
Census-designated places in Fairfield County, Connecticut
Census-designated places in Connecticut
Populated coastal places in Connecticut